MLB 2000 is a Major League Baseball video game for the PlayStation. The color commentary for the game is from Dave Campbell and the play by play announcer is Vin Scully. Anaheim Angels hitter Mo Vaughn was featured on the cover.

It has been preceded by MLB '99 and succeeded by MLB 2001.

Reception

The game received "favorable" reviews according to the review aggregation website GameRankings. Next Generation said that the game "swings for the fences, but falls short. It doesn't do anything truly innovative, and it needed to in order to make up for some of the more annoying features of the game. It's still a fun game, but not the leader of the pack." Kraig Kujawa of Official U.S. PlayStation Magazine said, "If you're a die-hard fan of the MLB series, then MLB 2000 is worth picking up since it offers more of exactly the same. But if you have last year's MLB or no baseball game at all, then pick up EA's Triple Play 2000. It's better, and [it] has taken better advantage of its time in the off-season."

Notes

References

External links
 
 

1999 video games
Major League Baseball video games
North America-exclusive video games
PlayStation (console) games
PlayStation (console)-only games
Video games developed in the United States